Samarendra Nath Biswas (1 May 1926 – 4 January 2005) was an Indian theoretical physicist specialized in theoretical high energy physics,  
particle physics and mathematical physics and is known for his work in several diverse areas.

Life, education and career
Samarendra Nath Biswas (1 May 1926 – 4 January 2005) was born in the undivided Bengal now part of Bangladesh and had his education there till the graduate level graduating from Pabna Edward college. He obtained his DPhil degree (1951) from the University of Calcutta and PhD degree (under the supervision of Herbert S. Green) (1958) from the University of Adelaide, Australia. He worked in theoretical physics, specializing in elementary particle physics. He was a Fellow at the Tata Institute of Fundamental Research, Mumbai (1958–64).  Professor of Physics, Centre for Advanced Study in Physics, Department of Physics and Astrophysics, University of Delhi (1969–91), during which he also headed the Department for a period of  three years (1977-1979). He was Dean, School of Environmental Science, Jawahar Lal Nehru University, Delhi (1974–76).

Scientific research
Biswas worked in several diverse areas of theoretical high energy physics and particle physics, that includes his early work in collaboration with Herbert S. Green on the Bethe-Salpeter equation and its solution, several investigations in particle physics phenomenology, two-dimensional quantum electrodynamics, analysis of anharmonic oscillator in quantum mechanics, scattering theory, study of dispersion relations in collision processes of elementary particles based on unitarity and analyticity, geometric phases of wave function in quantum mechanics and quantum optics, equation of state of neutron stars, quark stars, weak interaction processes, weak decays involving neutral currents, processes involving stellar energy loss, supersymmetry in weak currents, chiral anomalies, super-propagator for a non-polynomial field, phase transitions in gauge theories, development of supersymmetric classical mechanics, supersymmetric quantum mechanics, stochastic quantization, quark stars, continued fraction theory, role  of parastatistics in statistical mechanics,

Biswas has written over 90 scientific articles, which have received a large number of citations.

Authored books

Classical Mechanics
Quantum Mechanics

Awards and honors
Fellow, Tata Institute of Fundamental Research, Mumbai (1958–64)
UGC National Lecturer (1974)
Senior Associate Member of International Centre for Theoretical Physics, Trieste (1976–81)
Fellow, Indian National Science Academy, New Delhi
Fellow, Indian Academy of Sciences, Bangalore
Fellow, National Academy of Sciences (India), Allahabad

References

External links
Indian National Science Academy, New Delhi Profile
Indian Academy of Sciences, Bengaluru, Fellow Profile
Inspirehep Publications Profile
Research Gate Publications Profile
Former faculty, department of physics and astrophysics, University of Delhi

1926 births
2005 deaths
University of Adelaide alumni
Fellows of the Indian National Science Academy
Bengali physicists
Fellows of the Indian Academy of Sciences
Indian particle physicists
Indian theoretical physicists
20th-century Indian physicists
21st-century Indian physicists